Prime Sentinels are an advanced type of Sentinel which exist in Marvel Comics. They are a human/machine hybrid that uses nanotechnology from the "Days of Future Past" alternate future.

Creation
The Prime Sentinels were created when Bastion initiated the Operation: Zero Tolerance program. These Sentinels were actually humans who had been fitted with cybernetic nanotech implants which, upon activation, transformed the humans into armored beings with powerful weapons systems. These altered humans were set up as sleeper agents, unaware of their natures until a signal from the Operation: Zero Tolerance base activated their programming. These Sentinels were used by Bastion to capture Professor X for his own purposes, as well as attack various mutants associated with the X-Men across the country. Bastion and his Prime Sentinels were eventually defeated by the X-Men with help from the government agency S.H.I.E.L.D., who shut down Operation: Zero Tolerance.

It was assumed that the threat of the Prime Sentinels and their second generation was over, upon the arrest of Bastion and the end of Operation: Zero Tolerance. However, when the mutant race endured another extinct event with the release of the Terrigen Mists into the atmosphere, the Omega Sentinels now revering the Terrigen Mists that's poisoning mutants, returned violently when the mutants were at their lowest.

Powers and abilities
Prime Sentinels are equipped with several technological enhancements, superpowers bestowed ranging towards: flight, enhanced physicals, optic lasers and force-blasts as well as being able to dampen or disrupt the powers of mutants around them. On board scanning and homing sensors which enable them to detect the presence of Homo Superior within their vicinity, backed by combat computers which allow them to compensate for surprising events (say, the arrival of police cars) faster than normal humans. Finally, their programming may use the natural personality along with the original form of the host to lull unsuspecting targets into conversation, at which point they dampen their powers and kill them.

Omega Prime Sentinels, like Karima Shapandar, are equipped with mechanical regeneration coupled with some level of electromagnetic powers, but these were apparently prototypes, as their designs are clunkier than other Prime Sentinels. Other tools Karima shows that Omega Sentinels are equipped with include adaptive countermeasure facilities which enable them to fabricate specialized weaponry tailored to counter specific mutant adversaries. Able to become resilient towards damage dealt prior to their chassis, as well as produce weaponized solutions angled towards dealing with a specific mutant target.

In X-Men 2000 Annual they, like Omega Sentinels, are shown to have limited nano-mechanical morphing abilities. Able to morph or sprout cannon artillery from their body parts for greater arms fire. One of the deadliest abilities of the Prime Sentinels is displayed to be the lethal injection of nanomachines into another human being that will turn the target into a Prime Sentinel. It can be noticed that in the selfsame episode Rogue tries to use her personality-absorbing powers on one of the Prime Sentinels only to find nothing at all: she then states that nothing of the original host remains once the Prime Sentinel personality has taken over, though this is questionable as Magneto and Xavier were able to restore Karima's personality.

Known Prime Sentinels
 Agent Boyd
 Agent Mathers
 Arvell
 Curtis
 Daria
 Felipe
 Ginny Mahoney - Known as Unit #1031.
 Helmut
 Karima Shapandar
 Mustang
 Number 5
 Sanjit Shaara - Known as Unit #3.
 Saroyan
 Tanya

In other media

Video games
 Prime Sentinels appear as bosses in the fighting game X-Men: Next Dimension, which is based loosely on the events of Operation: Zero Tolerance. In the game, Prime Sentinels released their leader, Bastion, from S.H.I.E.L.D. custody. During an invasion at the Xavier Institute, they captured a weakened Forge after he destroys a Prime Sentinel. Later, they attack Magneto in Genosha, but Magneto destroys them. After the X-Men makes an uneasy alliance with the Brotherhood of Mutants, they attack the Citadel, and several Prime Sentinels were destroyed.
 Prime Sentinels appear in X-Men Legends. In this version, they are called Bio-Sentinels and they are under control by General William Kincaid (who is very similar to an X-Men villain, William Stryker). They were destroyed when the X-Men saved a younger version of Bishop from being killed. In the end, it was revealed they were controlled by Master Mold (which is a giant Sentinel in the game). The X-Men defeated Master Mold and the Bio-Sentinels were seemingly destroyed.
 Prime Sentinels appear in Marvel: Avengers Alliance.

References

External links
 Prime Sentinel at Marvel Wiki

Marvel Comics robots
Marvel Comics cyborgs